Erin Cleaver (born 6 February 2000) is an Australian Paralympic athlete with cerebral palsy. She represented Australia at the 2016 Rio Paralympics in athletics.

Personal
Cleaver was born on 6 February 2000 in Tamworth, New South Wales. She was born with cerebral palsy right-sided hemiplegia, which affects the movement in her right arm and leg. Her family moved to Newcastle, New South Wales. She attended Hunter Sports High School.

Athletics
Cleaver took up athletics while at primary school in Barraba, New South Wales. In 2010, she took up athletics with a disability and was classified as a T38 athlete. At the 2015 IPC Athletics World Championships in Doha, Cleaver competed in three events. She finished fifth in women's 100 metres T38, 4th in the women's long jump T38, and competed in the women's 4 x 100 metre relay (T35-38) where her team was disqualified for a baton change outside the takeover zone.

In 2015, she was awarded the Outstanding Individual Performance by an Academy athlete at the 2015 Hunter Academy of Sport Awards.

In the 2016 Rio Paralympics Cleaver competed in the T38 Long jump event where she placed 5th. She also competed in the T35-38 4 × 100 metre relay in a team with Brianna Coop, Jodi Jones-Elkington, Isis Holt, Torita Isaac and Ella Azura Pardy where they placed 3rd overall.

At the 2017 World Para Athletics Championships in London, she won the silver medal in the Long Jump T38 with a jump of 4.61m and finished 7th in the 100m T38.

References

External links
 
 
 Erin Cleaver at Australian Athletics Historical Results
 

2000 births
Athletes (track and field) at the 2016 Summer Paralympics
Athletes (track and field) at the 2018 Commonwealth Games
Australian female long jumpers
Cerebral Palsy category Paralympic competitors
Commonwealth Games medallists in athletics
Commonwealth Games silver medallists for Australia
Living people
Medalists at the 2016 Summer Paralympics
Paralympic athletes of Australia
Paralympic bronze medalists for Australia
Paralympic medalists in athletics (track and field)
People from Tamworth, New South Wales
Sportswomen from New South Wales
21st-century Australian women
Medallists at the 2018 Commonwealth Games